Ioan Gheorghiu (born March 5, 1947) is a former Romanian ice hockey player. He played for the Romania men's national ice hockey team at the 1968 Winter Olympics in Grenoble, and the 1976 Winter Olympics in Innsbruck.

References

1947 births
Living people
Ice hockey players at the 1968 Winter Olympics
Ice hockey players at the 1976 Winter Olympics
Olympic ice hockey players of Romania
Romanian ice hockey forwards
Sportspeople from Bucharest